Salabacke Church is a church in Sala backe, Uppsala, Sweden that was opened in 1958. The church was designed by Sten Hummel-Gumaelius and is made of wood. It suffered an arson attack in 1993 but was later rebuilt with an almost identical design.

History 

When the population in the newly established Sala backe area in Uppsala grew in the early 1950s, the need for a small church became apparent. The architect Sten Hummel-Gumaelius – cooperating with Jean Michon Bordes, proposed a design which was approved and construction of the church began by the firm Anders Diös. It was opened on 14 December 1958.

The church used to belong to Uppsala Cathedral parish, but it later became part of Vaksala parish when the parish borders were changed in 1963.

An arson destroyed the main church building in July 1993, but the parish buildings survived the fire. It was rebuilt with mostly the same design after the fire, though minor changes were made. A roof window was made a bit bigger and the sacristy near the southern wall of the chancel was expanded.

Architecture 

The building contains low rows of parish buildings combined with the nave which is characterized by its height and space, with a steep pitched roof and clean wooden surfaces. The floor-to-ceiling rafters of laminated timber contribute to the nave's individuality. The nave has been likened to a ship with the keel upwards.

Inventory 

The altarpiece that was installed on 27 October 1963 depicts Jesus' entry into Jerusalem and was painted by Bror Hjorth. It was the only thing that could be saved from the 1993 fire, due to the firefighters concentrating their efforts on the chancel wall.

Three pieces of textile art were donated to the church for its 25-year anniversary. They were made by Bärbel Neumann and decorate the church walls.

The organ, built by Grönlunds Orgelbyggeri, was installed in 1997. The organ architect Kerstin Fernert based the colors on Bror Hjorth's altarpiece.

Gallery

References 

Churches in Uppsala County
Churches in the Diocese of Uppsala
1993 fires in Europe
Fires in Sweden